The GE U20C diesel-electric locomotive was introduced by GE Transportation Systems as an export model in 1964. It was powered by the 8-cylinder 7FDL-8 engine. This locomotive is used worldwide with many variations and modifications. Different engines may be used, e.g. 7FDL8 and 7FDL12. Like the other members of the Universal series, it can be built to suit all track gauges.

Indonesian U20C

A unique modification is the wide cab version of the  U20C used on the  gauge Indonesian railroad and operated by PT Kereta Api Indonesia (Indonesian National Railway Company). Unlike other models of the U20C, with short hood cabin, the Indonesian U20C features a full-width cabin, for comfort and better sight of track and signals. It is classified as CC203 by PT Kereta Api Indonesia. The wide cab was built by Goninan Locomotive Work (now UGL Rail) in Australia.

Construction
Between 1995 and 2000, 41 units of this locomotive type were delivered to the Indonesia. Which was numbered as CC203 01-41. The first batch is number 01-12 which were imported from GE Transportation in Erie, Pennsylvania, United States. And numbers 13-41 were built locally by PT GE Lokomotif Indonesia, a joint company between PT Industri Kereta Api Indonesia / Indonesian Railway Industry (PT INKA) and GE Transportation. The CC 203 was designed between Goninan, Australia and GE, USA.  In which Goninan constructed the wide cabin and GE constructed the engine and the body.

Operations

37 locomotives in Java are still in operation, and were allocated for pulling express passenger trains, but in special conditions they pull 3rd class and sometimes freight trains as well. Initially, CC 203 trains used a livery featuring two blue stripes of different shades (the lighter blue stripe above the darker blue stripe) and with the Indonesian Ministry of Transportation logo in the hood and the former Indonesian Railway Public Corporation (Perumka) logo (inherited by its successor Kereta Api Indonesia (KAI) until 2011). Since Kereta Api Indonesia's 2011 rebranding, CC 203s were then repainted with KAI's current locomotive liveries. This livery didn't change during the 2020 KAI rebranding.

Operational history
Class CC 203s were built to commemorate 50 years of Proclamation of Indonesian Independence in 1995 and was initially built to haul Perumka's then-new Argo trains: the JS950 Argobromo and the JB250 Argogede; Perumka would then launch several other Argo trains. After the railway (now reincorprated as a limited company) acquired newer locomotives like the CC 204 (GE C20EMP) and CC 206, CC 203s were no longer the main locomotive of Argo trains. CC 203 now haul most trains in Java - mostly mixed-class, business (about to be phased out), and economy passenger trains, as well as freight trains occasionally.  Also, a pair of CC 203 class from Jatinegara motive power depot also used as a locomotive for special Presidential Trains before being replaced by CC 206s, also operated in double traction for safety and other reasons. While in Sumatra, 4 units of CC 203 class (CC 203 31-34 in old numbering system or CC 203 01 01-04 in the new system) were used in double traction mode to haul pulp train for a company named PT Tanjung Enim Lestari Pulp and Paper until 2016. These particular CC 203s were allocated at Tanjung Karang depot, Lampung. Since 2019, all of CC 203 locomotives in Sumatra were inoperative and retired.

C20EMP

In 2006, GE Locomotives Indonesia introduced a brand new locomotive with full computer controls. It was given the model name as C20EMP and still used the 7FDL-8 engine. The overall shape is similar to other Indonesian CC 203s, but the C20EMP has a Brightstar Sirius on-board computer to control the propulsion and transmission, for also better fuel economy and lifetime. The power rating is 2150 HP but the power output is 1950 HP. Because the results were very good, PT Kereta Api Indonesia, made a contract with PT Industri Kereta Api Indonesia (PT INKA) to build 20 more locomotives. Then, the brand-new C20EMP was delivered from GE and was assembled at PT Industri Kereta Api Indonesia (PT INKA). These C20EMPs were numbered as CC 204 08-11 and then would be renumbered as CC 204 12-17. However, to comply with the most recent regulation, the numbering were changed into CC204 06 01 - 02, CC204 07 01 - 02, CC204 08 01 - 02 and CC204 09 01 - 04. CC204 08-09 were delivered in 2006, CC204 10-11 was delivered in 2007. A total of 30 locomotives were manufactured before production ended in 2011. While in Java, C20EMPs (CC 204) were mostly pulling Argo class trains and other executive class trains alongside the CC 203. All the CC204s previously used for hauling coal trains in South Sumatra now replaced by CC206 (CM20EMP) from Java. Currently CC204 are used for hauling passenger trains, short coal trains, and another light freight train such as fuel, pulp and cement trains.

CC 204 locomotives still used a livery featuring two blue stripes of different shades (the lighter blue stripe above the darker blue stripe) and without the Indonesian Ministry of Transportation logo in the short hood and the former Indonesian Railway Public Corporation (Perumka) logo (inherited by its successor Kereta Api Indonesia (KAI) until 2011). This livery didn't change during the 2011 and 2020 KAI rebranding.

Export version

In the year 2000, PT Industri Kereta Api Indonesia (PT INKA) made the last CC 203 for Philippines Port Railways. It had the same specifications as an average Indonesian CC 203. But after 7 years of revenue service, the container rail service was closed down. The locomotive was refurbished and was shipped to Australia for the Coote Industrial Company. After strip down inspections and maintenance, the locomotive was put back on revenue service.

Around 2015, this locomotive (numbered U201) was acquired by Transperth Train Operations - the commuter rail operator in Perth, Western Australia - whose fleet otherwise consists solely of electric multiple units. U201 replaced Transperth's earlier diesel shunter, a Westrail MA-class locomotive, which was in turn acquired by Hotham Valley Railway, a tourist heritage railway operating south of Perth. U201 is now based at Transperth's Claisebrook depot.

Brazil 
Unlike the Indonesian U20C model, the Brazil model retains the usual GE front cab design, as seen in the U14C and U15C locomotives. Specifications are nearly the same to the Indonesian U20C locomotive.

Gallery

See also
 List of GE locomotives

References

Further reading 
 

U20C
C-C locomotives
Diesel-electric locomotives of Indonesia
Diesel-electric locomotives of Brazil
Railway locomotives introduced in 1995
3 ft 6 in gauge locomotives of Indonesia
Metre gauge diesel locomotives
5 ft 3 in gauge locomotives
Co′Co′ locomotives